Philip Crowe may refer to:
 Philip Crowe (rugby union), English-born Australian surgical oncologist, cricketer and rugby union international
 Philip K. Crowe, American journalist, author, intelligence officer and diplomat
 Phil Crowe, Canadian ice hockey winger